A bullet fee is a financial charge levied on the family of executed prisoners. Bullet fees have been levied in the Islamic Republic of Iran, Kingdom of Yugoslavia, as well as in the People's Republic of China, and Nazi Germany on the families of executed prisoners.

See also 

 Execution by shooting
 Execution by firing squad
 Lin Zhao

References

Capital punishment
Execution equipment
Execution methods